Romsø is a Danish island in the Great Belt off the coast of Funen. It has an area of 1.09 km2 and has, since 1996, no permanent residents. A defunct lighthouse and a few houses are located on the island; a substantial part of its area is covered by forest. 
The island is privately owned; although it is not closed to the general public some restrictions may apply.

Visitors may reach Romsø by a small passenger boat that departs from Kerteminde.

External links 
 Details on Romsø from Kerteminde town portal
 Website of the passenger boat to Romsø
 Environmental report from the Ministry of the Environment of Denmark

Islands of Denmark
Geography of Kerteminde Municipality